British Columbia hosts 22 species of native and introduced salmonids.  This list reflects the conservation status of British Columbia salmonids. Status from BC Species and Ecosystems Explorer. Status definitions from NatureServe.

Definitions

Provincial status (S)
 X = presumed extirpated
 H = historical (species)/possibly extirpated (communities) 
 1 = critically imperiled 
 2 = imperiled 
 3 = special concern, vulnerable to extirpation or extinction 
 4 = apparently secure 
 5 = demonstrably widespread, abundant, and secure.
 NA = not applicable
 NR = unranked
 U = unrankable

B. C. List
 Red: Includes any indigenous species or subspecies that have, or are candidates for, extirpated, endangered, or threatened status in British Columbia. Extirpated taxa no longer exist in the wild in British Columbia, but do occur elsewhere. Endangered taxa are facing imminent extirpation or extinction. Threatened taxa are likely to become endangered if limiting factors are not reversed. Not all Red-listed taxa will necessarily become formally designated. Placing taxa on these lists flags them as being at risk and requiring investigation.
 Blue: Includes any indigenous species or subspecies considered to be of special concern (formerly vulnerable) in British Columbia. Taxa of special concern have characteristics that make them particularly sensitive or vulnerable to human activities or natural events. Blue-listed taxa are at risk, but are not extirpated, endangered or threatened. 
 Yellow: Includes species that are apparently secure and not at risk of extinction. Yellow-listed species may have red- or blue-listed subspecies.
 Exotic: Species that have been moved beyond their natural range as a result of human activity. Exotic species are also known as alien species, foreign species, introduced species, non-indigenous species and non-native species. Exotic species are excluded from the Red, Blue and Yellow Lists as a Provincial Conservation Status Rank is not applicable (i.e. SNA).

Status by species

References

Salmonidae
Fish of Canada
Biota of North America by conservation status
British Columbia-related lists
Nature conservation in Canada
Environment of British Columbia
Lists of biota of Canada
Natural history of British Columbia